Federal Highway I-20D (Carretera Federal), known as the Libramiento de Irapuato, is a toll highway that serves as a bypass of the city of Irapuato, Guanajuato. The road is operated by HOATSA, which charges 68 pesos per vehicle to travel the full course of the highway. The road opened on March 15, 2011 at a construction cost of 900 million pesos.

A portion of the course of Federal Highway 43D, the road to León, is shared with Mexico Federal Highway I-20D.

References

External links
Libramiento de Irapuato website

Mexican Federal Highways
2011 establishments in Mexico
Transportation in Guanajuato